Ford Lambart, 5th Earl of Cavan (1718–1772) was an Irish peer and freemason.

He was born in 1718 in Maryborough, son of the 4th Earl and Margaret Trant. Lambart was elected Grand Master of the Grand Lodge of Ireland in 1767, a post he held for the next two years.

He had no son, and at his death, his titles passed to a cousin, Richard Lambart, a grandson of the 3rd Earl.

References

1718 births
1772 deaths
Earls of Cavan